Telaulim (or Talaulim) is a village in the Ponda taluka (sub-district) of Goa.

Area, population

 India census,,,  Telaulim in Ponda taluka has an area of 246 hectares, a total of 604 households, a population of 2,554 (comprising 1,289 males and 1.265 females) with an under-six years population of 202 (comprising 101 boys and 101 girls).

Location

It lies approx 5.2 km (via the Durbhat Road) from the sub-district (taluka) headquarters of Ponda town, and approx 34.9 km away from the district North Goa headquarters of Panaji or Panjim.

Local jurisdiction

Telaulim (Talaulim) lies under the Wadi-Talaulim gram panchayat.

References

Villages in North Goa district